The K3 League is the third tier of South Korean football league system, which was created from the rebranding of the Korea National League (2003–2019) and the former K3 League (2007–2019) into K3 League and K4 League in 2020. 16 teams are currently playing in the league.

History  

The Korean National Semi-Professional Football League, the semi-professional league of South Korea, began in 1964 and lasted until it was replaced by the Korea National League (KNL) in 2003. 15 clubs played in the new KNL. With the establishment of the K League Challenge (currently K League 2) as a second-tier professional league in 2013, the number of clubs in the KNL decreased. Since 2017, only eight clubs participated in the KNL. Meanwhile, the amateur K3 League developed its own promotion and relegation systems with the Advanced Tier and the Basic Tier. In 2015, the Korea Football Association announced its plan of structural reform to merge the KNL and K3 League. The plan was realized in the late 2019, in which the KNL and the former K3 League were rebranded into the current K3 League and K4 League. In 2020, the new K3 League was launched with the total of 16 teams, consisting of the eight teams from the KNL and seven teams (six from the Advanced Tier and one from the Basic Tier) from the former K3 League.

Competition format
The promotion and relegation system exists between the K3 League and the K4 League.

In 2020, the K3 League will have 16 teams played one stage double round-robin again total 30 of games. Teams will not be able to promote to the higher tier since the K League 2 is played under the different league system. However, the teams will be able to get relegated to the K4 League.

In 2021, the promotion and relegation system between K League 2 and K3 League had been planned following the start from 2023 season.

In 2023, the season to feature promotion and relegation starting from this season, relegation from the K League 2 to the K3 League will be introduced.

Current clubs

Former clubs
The list does not include promoted or relegated clubs.

Champions

Titles by season

Titles by club
Clubs in bold compete in the top flight as of the 2023 season. Clubs in italic no longer exist

See also
 K4 League
 Korea National League
 K3 League (2007–2019)
 South Korean football league system

References

External links
 K3 League official website at KFA 

 
2020 establishments in South Korea
3
Sports leagues established in 2020
Third level football leagues in Asia
Professional sports leagues in South Korea